The National War College (NWC) of the United States is a school in the National Defense University. It is housed in Roosevelt Hall on Fort Lesley J. McNair, Washington, D.C., the third-oldest Army post still active.

History
The National War College (NWC) was officially established on July 1, 1946, as an upgraded replacement for the Army-Navy Staff College, which operated from June 1943 to July 1946. The college was one of James Forrestal's favorite causes.

According to Lt. Gen. Leonard T. Gerow, President of the Board that recommended its formation:

Mid-level and senior military officers who are likely to be promoted to the senior ranks are selected to study at the War College to prepare for higher staff and command positions. About 75 percent of the student body is composed of equal representation from the land, air, and sea (including Marine and Coast Guard) services. The remaining 25 percent are drawn from the Department of State and other federal departments and agencies. In addition, international fellows from several countries join the student body. The curriculum is based upon critical analysis of strategic problem solving with an emphasis on strategic leadership. As of the 2014–2015 academic year, the curriculum was based upon a core standard throughout National Defense University.

Because of the NWC's privileged location close to the White House, the Supreme Court, and Capitol Hill, it has been able throughout its history to call upon an extraordinarily well-connected array of speakers to animate its discussions. All lectures at the National War College are conducted under a strict "no quotation nor attribution" policy, which has facilitated discussion on some of the most challenging issues of the day.

Commandants
 Vice Admiral Harry W. Hill (June 1946–1949)
 Lieutenant General Harold R. Bull (1949–1952)
 Lieutenant General Harold A. Craig (1952–1955)
 Vice Admiral Edmund T. Wooldridge (1955–1958)  
 Lieutenant General Thomas L. Harrold (1958–1961)
 Lieutenant General Francis H. Griswold (1961–1964)
 Vice Admiral Fitzhugh Lee III (1964–1967)
 Lieutenant General Andrew Goodpaster (1967–1968)
 Lieutenant General John E. Kelly (1968–1970)
 Lieutenant General John B. McPherson (1970–1973)
 Vice Admiral Marmaduke G. Bayne (1973–1975)
 Major General James S. Murphy (1975–1976)
 Major General Harrison Lobdell Jr. (1976–1978)
 Rear Admiral John C. Barrow (1978–1980)
 Major General Lee E. Surut (1980–1983)     
 Major General Perry M. Smith (1983–1986)     
 Rear Admiral John F. Addams (1986–1989)     
 Major General Gerald P. Stadler (1989–1992)     
 Major General John C. Fryer Jr. (1992–1995)
 Rear Admiral Michael McDevitt (1995–1997)
 Rear Admiral Thomas Marfiak (1997–1999)
 Rear Admiral Daniel R. Bowler (1999–2000)
 Major General Reginal G. Clemmons (2000–2003)
 Rear Admiral Richard D. Jaskot (2003–2006)
 Major General Teresa Marné Peterson (2006–2007)
 Major General Robert P. Steel (2007–2010)
 Rear Admiral Douglas J. McAneny (2011-2013)
 Brigadier General Guy "Tom" Cosentino (2013-2015)
 Brigadier General Darren E. Hartford (2015-2017)
 Brigadier General Chad T. Manske (2017-2019)
 Rear Admiral Cedric E. Pringle (2019–2021)
 Brigadier General Jeff H. Hurlbert (2021-present)

Source for commandants up to 2010.

Alumni and influence
American graduates of the National War College include a secretary of state and a secretary of defense, national security advisors, a senator and congressman, and a White House chief of staff, in addition to chairmen of the joint chiefs of staff and numerous other current and former flag officers, general officers, and U.S. ambassadors. No other graduate institution of national security policy in the world has had more impact in the development of the United States senior cadre of national security leaders. Graduates from other countries include prime ministers from nations as diverse as Iran and Bulgaria, as well as many national military leaders from every continent on earth except Antarctica. Notable graduates include:

--A--
John R. Allen, retired Marine Corps General, president of the Brookings Institution
David W. Allvin, general and vice chief of staff of the United States Air Force
Gholam Reza Azhari, prime minister of Iran

--B--
Robert H. Barrow, 27th Commandant of the Marine Corps
Edward L. Beach Jr., World War II submarine officer and best-selling novelist
William B. Black, Jr., deputy director National Security Agency
John Beyrle, U.S. Ambassador to Russia
Arnold W. Braswell, retired Air Force General
Bernard Brodie, one of the initial nuclear theorists
William Brownfield, U.S. Ambassador to Venezuela, Chile, and Colombia
John Ray Budner, the late Brigadier General, formerly in command of the North American Air Defense Command Combat Operations Center

--C--
Richard D. Clarke U.S. army general, commander, special operations command
Wesley Clark, former NATO Supreme Allied Commander Europe
Bernard A. Clarey, U.S. admiral

--D--
Raymond G. Davis, 14th Assistant Commandant of the Marine Corps
Eugene Peyton Deatrick, USAF general
Roy L. DeHart, USAF Colonel, Author of Fundamentals of Aerospace Medicine
Martin Dempsey, former Chairman of the Joint Chiefs of Staff
R. Scott Dingle, U.S. army general 45th surgeon general of the United States Army

--F--
John D. Feeley, U.S. ambassador

--G--
Charles A. Gillespie Jr., U.S. ambassador to Colombia
Alan L. Gropman, military officer, author, and academic

--H--
Mark P. Hertling USA Lieutenant General, Commander of US Army in Europe
Eric T. Hill, U.S.A.F major general

--J--
James L. Jones, 32nd Commandant of the Marine Corps, 14th NATO Supreme Allied Commander Europe, 21st National Security Advisor 

--K--
John F. Kelly, retired Marine Corps General, 28th White House chief of staff
Kristie Kenney, U.S. ambassador to Thailand and to the Philippines
Donald Keyser, State Department China expert accused of espionage 
Mark Kimmitt, assistant secretary of state for politico-military affairs, the State Department
Charles C. Krulak, 31st Commandant of the Marine Corps

--L--
Bruce Laingen, U.S. ambassador to Malta, American hostage in Iranian Hostage Crisis
Jeannie Leavitt, first U.S.A.F. fighter pilot, general
Homer Litzenberg, Marine Corps Lieutenant General 

--M--
James Mattis, Marine Corps General, 5th Commander of the United States Joint Forces Command, 11th Commander of the United States Central Command, 26th Secretary of Defense
John McCain, former U.S. Senator
Robert Macfarlane, National Security Advisor under president Ronald Reagan
Thomas McInerney, U.S.A.F lieutenant general
Merrill A. McPeak, former U.S.A.F Chief of Staff
Godfrey McHugh, former military aide to President John F. Kennedy

--N--
Lucien Nedzi, U.S. congressman
Richard Norland U.S. ambassador to Libya

--O--
Robin Olds, brigadier general, "triple ace" in World War II and Vietnam

--P--
Peter Pace, Marine Corps General, 6th Vice Chairman of the Joint Chiefs of Staff, 16th Chairmen of the Joint Chiefs of Staff
Donald Parsons former US Military Attaché to Canada
Andika Perkasa, commander, Indonesian National Armed Forces
Czesław Piątas, chief of general staff, Polish army
Colin Powell, former U.S. Secretary of State and Chairman of the Joint Chiefs of Staff
Edward Pietrzyk, commander in chief, Polish land forces, two-time Polish ambassador

--R--
John M. Richardson, admiral, 31st chief of naval operations
Robert C. Richardson III, brigadier general, principal in the Laconia incident

--S--
Beth Sanner, deputy director of national intelligence
Norton A. Schwartz, former U.S. Air Force Chief of Staff
Dorothy Shea U.S. ambassador to Lebanon
Robert Lee Scott Jr., USAF brigadier general and fighter ace
Hugh Shelton, former Chairman of the Joint Chiefs of Staff
Abraham Sinkov, U.S. cryptanalyst and NSA official
Eric Shinseki, former U.S. Army Chief of Staff and Secretary of Veterans Affairs
Jay B. Silveria, superintendent, United States Air Force Academy
James G. Stavridis former Supreme Allied Commander Europe, admiral, U.S. Navy
J. Christopher Stevens, the late U.S. Ambassador to Libya
Stephanie S. Sullivan, U.S. ambassador to Ghana
James C. Swan, United Nations secretary general's special representative for Somalia

--W--
Mark Welsh, USAF general
Cedric T. Wins, U.S. army general

--Y--
Donald Yamamoto, U.S. ambassador to Somalia
Stefan Yanev, prime minister of Bulgaria
Marie Yovanovitch U.S. ambassador to Ukraine

--Z--
Anthony Zinni, Marine Corps General, 6th Commander, United States Central Command
Elmo Zumwalt, former U.S. Chief of Naval Operations
James P. Zumwalt, U.S. ambassador to Senegal

Roosevelt Hall
Roosevelt Hall (built 1903–1907) is a Beaux Arts–style building housing the NWC since its inception in 1946. Designed by the New York architectural firm McKim, Mead & White, it is now designated a National Historic Landmark. It is listed on the National Register of Historic Places.

See also
 USAF Air War College
 Dwight D. Eisenhower School for National Security and Resource Strategy
 List of National Historic Landmarks in the District of Columbia
 Marine Corps War College
 National Register of Historic Places listings in the District of Columbia
 Naval War College
 United States Army War College

References

External links

National War College homepage

Military academies of the United States
Military education and training in the United States
National Historic Landmarks in Washington, D.C.
National Defense University
War colleges
Universities and colleges in Washington, D.C.
1946 establishments in Washington, D.C.
Southwest Waterfront